Duyun East railway station is a railway station in Duyun, Qiannan Buyei and Miao Autonomous Prefecture, Guizhou, China. The station opened on 26 December 2014. The station is served by Guiyang–Guangzhou high-speed railway and will be served by Guiyang–Nanning high-speed railway.

See also 
 Duyun railway station

References 

Railway stations in Guizhou
Railway stations in China opened in 2014